is the Hello! Project 2005 shuffle group consisting of Ai Takahashi and Reina Tanaka of Morning Musume, along with Melon Kinenbi's Ayumi Shibata and Country Musume's Mai Satoda. The name comes from the word elegy. They released the single "" on June 22, 2005.

External links
 Official Hello! Project Profile

Hello! Project shuffle groups
Japanese pop music groups
Musical groups from Tokyo